Rosebud is an unincorporated community in Howard Township, Washington County, in the U.S. state of Indiana.

History
A post office was established at Rosebud in 1898, and remained in operation until 1901.

Geography

References

Unincorporated communities in Washington County, Indiana
Unincorporated communities in Indiana